The Bulgaria men's national water polo team is the representative for Bulgaria in international men's water polo.

Results

Olympic Games

1972 — 11th place
1980 — 12th place

World Championship
1973 — 13th place
1975 — 12th place
1978 — 8th place

FINA Water Polo World Cup 
 1979 — 8th place
 1981 — 8th place

Friendship Games 
 1984 — 5th place

References

Water polo
Men's national water polo teams
National water polo teams in Europe
National water polo teams by country
 
Men's sport in Bulgaria